Ian David Burchnall (born 11 February 1983) is an English football manager who is the assistant manager of Anderlecht. He holds the UEFA Pro Licence.

Managerial career
Burchnall started his coaching career at the age of 22 at the University of Leeds. He was later part of coaching staffs at Leeds United and Bradford City academies.

Sarpsborg 08
In 2012, Burchnall was signed by Norwegian club Sarpsborg 08 as Brian Deane's assistant manager.

Viking
On 22 October 2014, Burchnall accepted an offer from Viking to become Kjell Jonevret's assistant. Following Jonevret's departure from the club on 14 November 2016, Burchnall was offered the job as the club's new manager. He accepted the offer and signed on 24 November 2016. On 9 November 2017, he was fired from the job due to a run of bad results, culminating in relegation from Eliteserien. The firing sparked anger amongst supporters who set up a petition and created banners of protest against the director of football, Bård Wiggen, and the club due to the turbulent conditions Burchnall had to manage during his tenure. Shortly after, Bård Wiggen left the club.

Östersund
During his time at Leeds, Burchnall had met Graham Potter, Östersund's former coach. Through this contact, Burchnall became Potter's successor, taking over as head coach in the summer of 2018. In Burchnall's first season as manager he led the team to a 6th-place finish and 49 points, just 1 point and a place below the club record set the year before by Potter. The second season started with a club record return of points after the first 8 games. Despite challenges off the field Burchnall was widely credited with keeping the club in the Allsvenskan ensuring top flight football for the next season. In the summer of 2020 Burchnall stepped down as manager citing personal reasons to return to England and a clear difference in the clubs future vision. The supporter club hosted a party to thank Burchnall for his time in Ostersund.

Notts County
On 25 March 2021, Burchnall was appointed as head coach of National League side Notts County. In his first game in charge, on 27 March 2021, Notts County were beaten by part-time team Hornchurch in the semifinal of the FA Trophy. Burchnall won his first game as Notts County head coach on 2 April 2021, beating fellow National League side Wrexham. During the rest of April, Notts lost 4 of their next 6 games, resulting in the club falling outside of the playoffs positions. Results improved during May, with Notts winning 5 of their last 8 matches sending the Magpies to a 5th-place league finish.

Notts then faced local rivals Chesterfield in the National League play off quarter finals, they came from behind to win the game 3-2 with a late goal from defender Mark Ellis.

The play off semi finals saw Torquay FC host Notts County at Plainmoor on 12 June 2021. The game ended 2-2 meaning extra time would be needed to settle the tie. Torquay scored twice during this period and won the game 4–2. Torquay advanced to the 2021 National League final whilst Notts remained in their division for the 2021/2022 Season.

Notts started the 2021/22 season well, going  unbeaten throughout August and most of September, however form quickly changed after both Woking F.C and F.C. Halifax Town came from behind to beat the Magpies in the closing minutes. This left Notts outside the play off positions after their opening 10 games. The season ended with defeat in the Play-Offs Eliminator round, a 95th minute equaliser from Grimsby Town taking the match to extra-time where they scored another late goal to win the tie in the 119th minute and end County's season.

Forest Green Rovers
On 27 May 2022, Burchnall was appointed manager of recently promoted League One side Forest Green Rovers.

On 25 January 2023, Forest Green Rovers parted company with Burchnall leaving the club bottom of League One after having won just five of their league matches.

Managerial Statistics

References

1983 births
Living people
People from Leicester
Viking FK managers
Östersunds FK managers
English football managers
English expatriate sportspeople in Norway
Expatriate football managers in Norway
English expatriate football managers
English expatriate sportspeople in Sweden
Expatriate football managers in Sweden
Leeds United F.C. non-playing staff
Bradford City A.F.C. non-playing staff
Notts County F.C. managers
Eliteserien managers
Allsvenskan managers
National League (English football) managers
Forest Green Rovers F.C. managers
English Football League managers